The Savoy River (in French: rivière Savoy) is a tributary of the west bank of the Chaudière River which flows north to empty onto the south bank of the Saint Lawrence River. It flows in the municipalities of Saint-Elzéar and Sainte-Marie-de-Beauce, in the La Nouvelle-Beauce Regional County Municipality, in the administrative region of Chaudière-Appalaches, in Quebec, in Canada.

Geography 

The main neighboring watersheds of the Savoie river are:
 north side: Vallée River, rivière des Îles Brûlées, Chaudière River;
 east side: Chaudière River;
 south side: Nadeau River, Lessard River, Cliche River, rivière des Fermes;
 west side: Aulnaies stream, Beaurivage River, Fourchette River, Filkars River.

The Savoie river has its source in the Haut-Saint-Olivier range, in the municipality of Saint-Elzéar, on the north slope of Mont du Cosmos.

From its source (i.e. at the level of the Haut-Saint-Olivier road), the Savoie river flows on  divided into the following segments:
  north-east, up to Chemin du Haut-Saint-Thomas, which marks out the municipalities of Saint-Elzéar and Sainte-Marie-de-Beauce;
  northeasterly, crossing the rang Saint-Étienne-Sud road (which runs along the east bank of the Chaudière River), to its confluence.

The Savoie river empties on the west bank of the Chaudière River, in Sainte-Marie-de-Beauce.

Toponymy 
The toponym Rivière Savoie was formalized on October 6, 1983, at the Commission de toponymie du Québec.

See also 

 List of rivers of Quebec

References 

Rivers of Chaudière-Appalaches
La Nouvelle-Beauce Regional County Municipality